Joe Lorig (born June 21, 1973), is an American football coach who is currently the special teams coordinator for the Oregon Ducks.  Lorig played college football for the Western Oregon Wolves.

Coaching career

Early Coaching Career
After two years coaching defensive backs at Western Oregon, Lorig would spend the next eight seasons filling a variety of roles for Idaho State and head coach Larry Lewis.  During the 1999 season, Lorig served with wide receivers coach James Franklin. He then spent a season at UTEP, followed by three at Central Washington.

Arizona State
Lorig spent two seasons at Arizona State in 2012-2013, where he served as the special teams coordinator and cornerbacks coach.

Utah State
Lorig spent 2014 and 2015 as the linebackers and safeties coach for Utah State.

Memphis 
Lorig spent three seasons at Memphis serving under head coach Mike Norvell as their special teams coordinator and outside linebackers coach.  During his time as the special teams coordinator, Memphis finished in the Top 5 in kickoff return average twice and in the top 20 in kickoff-return defense every year. Memphis ranked second in return defense in 2016.  Under Lorig's coaching Tony Pollard tied an NCAA record with seven career kickoff returns for touchdowns. In 2016, Memphis returned three kickoffs for touchdowns, breaking a 21-year scoreless drought.  In addition, Lorig's special teams units did not allow a kickoff or punt return for a touchdown during his time at Memphis.

Penn State
On January 8, 2019, it was announced that Lorig would join Texas Tech and head coach Matt Wells as the special teams coordinator and defensive assistant. However on February 21, 2019, he went to Penn State , as special teams coordinator and defensive assistant, replacing Phil Galiano.

Oregon
On December 30, 2021, it was reported that Lorig would be joining Dan Lanning's inaugural Oregon staff. The two previously worked together for at Memphis and Arizona State.

References

External links
 Memphis profile

1973 births
Living people
People from Edmonds, Washington
Western Oregon University alumni
Western Oregon Wolves football players
Western Oregon Wolves football coaches
Idaho State Bengals football coaches
Central Washington Wildcats football coaches
Arizona State Sun Devils football coaches
Utah State Aggies football coaches
Memphis Tigers football coaches
Penn State Nittany Lions football coaches